Tan Hock Eng (born  in Penang) is a Malaysian Chinese business executive and philanthropist. He is the CEO of Broadcom Inc. He was the highest earning CEO in the US in 2017, earning US$103.2 million that year.

Early life
He received a scholarship to attend the Massachusetts Institute of Technology (MIT) in 1971. In 1975, he graduated with a bachelor's degree in mechanical engineering and earned a master's degree in the same subject later in the year. Tan also attended Harvard University to earn an MBA a few years later.

Career
He was managing director of Hume Industries in Malaysia from 1983 to 1988 before helming Pacven Investment from 1988 to 1992. He then held financial positions at General Motors Co and PepsiCo Inc before becoming the Vice President of Finance of Commodore International Ltd.

Tan went on to become the CEO of Integrated Circuit Systems Inc. When this was sold to Integrated Device Technology Inc, he became the latter company's chairman. Avago was created following a US$2.66 billion buyout of Integrated Circuit Systems in 2005. Tan was hired to lead the company as chief executive.

In 2015, Tan merged the company with Broadcom Corporation following an acquisition, leading to the creation of Broadcom Inc which he currently runs.

In November 2017 Broadcom announced that it had completed its move from Singapore back to the United States in a move which Tan claimed at the time would yield $20 billion yearly in revenue for the US Treasury.

In April 2020 Tan drew criticism when it was announced that he was forcing employees of Broadcom to return to work for 1 week a month during the COVID-19 outbreak. In September 2020, Tan stated that all Broadcom employees were working in the office in Asia excluding India, and 50% in North America.

Personal life
Tan married K. Lisa Yang. Born in Singapore, Yang graduated from Cornell University. After the family moved to the U.S., Yang worked as an investment banker on Wall Street until retiring.

The couple's three children spent their early years in Singapore. The family moved to Philadelphia after their son Douglas was diagnosed with autism by a pediatric neurologist at the Children's Hospital of Philadelphia who suggested the boy would receive a better education in the U.S. Douglas attended the Timothy School in Philadelphia, and now lives in a Devereux Advanced Behavioral Health group home.

Even their daughter Eva has milder autism. Yang helped Eva with her "poor auditory processing skills" when she started taking classes at Harcum College. Eva was later hired by SAP under their Autism at Work program.

The couple's other son does not have autism. He works as an investment banker in California.

Philanthropy
Tan and his wife donate money to their alma maters and autism charities.

In 2015, Tan honored former MIT professor Nam P. Suh by donating $4 million to the school to endow a mechanical engineering professorship.

The same year, the couple donated $10 million to Cornell University to fund the K. Lisa Yang and Hock E. Tan Employment and Disability Institute.

The couple donated $20 million to MIT in 2017 to fund research to find effective treatments for autism and find its causes. Their donation created the Hock E. Tan and K. Lisa Yang Center for Autism Research.

In 2019, the couple donated $20 million to Harvard Medical School to create the Tan-Yang Center for Autism Research, a sister of the MIT center.

Yang donated $2 million in 2020 to Neurodiversity in the Workplace, a nonprofit organization that helps employers find talented people with autism.

The couple donated $28 million in 2020 to MIT to create the Yang-Tan Center for Molecular Therapeutics in Neuroscience.

References 

Malaysian people of Chinese descent
Living people
People from Penang
1952 births
American people of Chinese descent
MIT School of Engineering alumni
Harvard Business School alumni
Broadcom